Bryn Taylor (née Tripucka; born August 26, 1980), is an American fashion stylist and founder of The Re-Stylist.  Originally based in New York, The Re-Stylist became a bicoastal business in December 2011, when Taylor moved to San Francisco.

Early life 
Taylor was born in Glen Ridge, New Jersey and is the granddaughter of Frank Tripucka and the niece of Kelly Tripucka.  She studied theatre at Northwestern University in Chicago before moving back to the east coast.

Career 
Taylor started her fashion career as a fit model for Holly Kristen in New York. She then spent two years in merchandising and product development at Phillips-Van Heusen before becoming an editor at SheFinds. She simultaneously began freelance editorial styling with Bryn Taylor Made. After leaving SheFinds, Taylor contributed articles to a number of fashion blogs and founded her personal styling business, The Re-Stylist.

Reception 
A number of articles have been written about Taylor's styling, as referenced below.

References 

American fashion businesspeople
Fashion stylists
1980 births
Living people
Northwestern University alumni
People from Glen Ridge, New Jersey